S. N. Hanumantha Rao (4 September 1929 – 29 July 2013) was an Indian cricket umpire. He stood in nine Test matches between 1978 and 1983 and two ODI games between 1981 and 1982. At first-class level, Rao made his umpiring debut aged 29, in the 1958–59 edition of the Ranji Trophy, and went on to umpire in 36 first-class matches over a 24-year career.

See also
 List of Test cricket umpires
 List of One Day International cricket umpires

References

1929 births
2013 deaths
Indian Test cricket umpires
Indian One Day International cricket umpires
People from Kolar
Cricketers from Karnataka